Statistics of Empress's Cup in the 2009 season.

Overview
It was contested by 32 teams, and Nippon TV Beleza won the championship.

Results

1st round
Hinomoto Gakuen High School 3-7 Waseda University
Je Vrille Kagoshima 1-4 Tokiwagi Gakuken High School
AS Elfen Sayama FC 11-0 Oita Trinita
Bunnys Kyoto SC 1-6 Kanagawa University
Shimizudaihachi Pleiades 5-0 ASC Adooma
Iga FC Kunoichi 2-0 Osaka Toin High School
JFA Academy Fukushima 7-1 Renaissance Kumamoto FC
Ehime Women's College 0-3 Fukuoka J. Anclas

2nd round
Ohara Gakuen JaSRA 1-1 (pen 4-3) Waseda University
Tokiwagi Gakuken High School 3-1 Fujieda Junshin High School
Nippon TV Menina 0-1 AS Elfen Sayama FC
Kanagawa University 2-0 Tokoha University Tachibana High School
Sakuyo High School 3-1 Shimizudaihachi Pleiades
Iga FC Kunoichi 1-0 Kibi International University
Kamimura Gakuen High School 1-5 JFA Academy Fukushima
Fukuoka J. Anclas 1-0 Fukui University of Technology Fukui High School

3rd round
Urawa Reds 4-0 Ohara Gakuen JaSRA
Tokiwagi Gakuken High School 0-2 JEF United Chiba
Speranza FC Takatsuki 1-3 AS Elfen Sayama FC
Kanagawa University 0-2 INAC Kobe Leonessa
TEPCO Mareeze 8-0 Sakuyo High School
Iga FC Kunoichi 0-2 Albirex Niigata
Okayama Yunogo Belle 4-0 JFA Academy Fukushima
Fukuoka J. Anclas 0-5 Nippon TV Beleza

Quarterfinals
Urawa Reds 2-0 JEF United Chiba
AS Elfen Sayama FC 0-2 INAC Kobe Leonessa
TEPCO Mareeze 1-0 Albirex Niigata
Okayama Yunogo Belle 1-5 Nippon TV Beleza

Semifinals
Urawa Reds 3-2 INAC Kobe Leonessa
TEPCO Mareeze 1-2 Nippon TV Beleza

Final
Nippon TV Beleza 2-0 Urawa Reds
Nippon TV Beleza won the championship.

References

Empress's Cup
2009 in Japanese women's football